Shaheed Uddham Singh is a 1999 Indian Punjabi-language biographical film based on the life of Udham Singh, an Indian Indian revolutionary who had witnessed the 1919 Amritsar massacre and wanted to avenge the mass killing of his countrymen. He was desperate to punish Michael O'Dwyer, the Lieutenant Governor of the Punjab for his involvement with the massacre. The film was theatrically released in India on 24 December 1999, just two days before Singh's birth centenary. The film was screened retrospective on 13 August 2016 at the Independence Day Film Festival jointly presented by the Indian Directorate of Film Festivals and Ministry of Defense, commemorating 70th Indian Independence Day.

Summary
Udham Singh Kamboj was born and brought up in a Sikh family in Punjab, British India. Enraged over Jallianwala Bagh massacre that took place in Amritsar in April 1919 during the day of Baisakhi festival, Singh swears vengeance. He sets about creating obstacles for the British colonial government, and is soon on wanted lists by the authorities. On one occasion he is shielded by a courtesan, Noor Jehan (Juhi Chawla). In order to achieve his vengeance, he travels to the United Kingdom, befriends some local Indians, as well as Irish nationalist, Irene Rose Palmer (Charleen Carswell). He kills Michael O'Dwyer (Dave Anderson), the Lieutenant Governor of Punjab, who in 1919, who had authorised Dyer's use of force, during a program at Caxton Hall in London. He is quickly apprehended, and jailed. He refuses to cooperate with the authorities, nor is he willing to accept that he is mentally incapable. During his trial, he is offered the opportunity to state his case for acquittal but his remarks were deemed incendiary by the judge, who forbade the press from publishing them. He was hanged on 31 July 1940 at Pentonville Prison in north London.

Cast
 Raj Babbar as Sardar Udham Singh Kamboj
 Gurdas Maan as Bhagat Singh
 Harsharan Singh as Sukhdev Thapar
 Shatrughan Sinha as Muhammad Khan
 Amrish Puri as The Sufi Saint
 Juhi Chawla as Noor Jehan
 Ranjeet as Giani Ji
 Tom Alter as Brig. Gen. Edward Harry Dyer
 Joseph Lamb as Lord of Adm. Winston Churchill
 Dave Anderson as Michael O'Dwyer
 Barry John as Lord Keeper Clement Attlee
 Barry John as Michael Atlee
 David McLennan as Neville Chamberlain
 Ranjeet as Gyaniji
 Charleen Carswell as Irene Rose Palmer
 Chetana Das as Udham Singh's mother 
 Raman Dhillon as Udham Singh's aunt
 Kimi Verma as Meeto

Music
The film's music was composed by Jagjit Singh.

 Song - "Zaat" sung by Durga Rangila
 Some songs sung by Gurdas Mann

References

External links 

 

1999 films
Punjabi-language Indian films
Indian biographical films
Films set in the Indian independence movement
Best Film on National Integration National Film Award winners
Cultural depictions of Bhagat Singh
Films set in the British Raj
Films set in the United Kingdom
Cultural depictions of Winston Churchill
Films set in Amritsar
Cultural depictions of Neville Chamberlain
1990s Punjabi-language films